Probotector is an alternate title originally given to a number of Contra games in Europe. By itself, the title was affixed to three different games, and may refer to the European localizations of:

 Contra (video game) for the Nintendo Entertainment System, 1987
 Operation C (video game) for the Game Boy, 1991
 Contra: Hard Corps for the Mega Drive, 1994

See also
 Super Contra, also known as Probotector II: Return of the Evil Forces.
 Contra III: The Alien Wars, also known as Super Probotector: Alien Rebels.